Eutropis macrophthalma is a species of skink found in Sulawesi.

References

Eutropis
Reptiles described in 2002
Reptiles of Indonesia
Endemic fauna of Indonesia
Taxa named by Patrick Mausfeld
Taxa named by Wolfgang Böhme (herpetologist)